Welsh House may refer to:

in the United States (by state then city)
Welsh House (Syracuse, New York), listed on the National Register of Historic Places (NRHP) in Onondaga County
Welsh House (Mandan, North Dakota), listed on the NRHP in Morton County
Gillett-Shoemaker-Welsh House, Waterville, Ohio, listed on the NRHP in Lucas County
Rafsnyder-Welsh House, Philadelphia, Pennsylvania, listed on the NRHP in Center City, Philadelphia
Welsh-Emery House, Richeyville, Pennsylvania, listed on the NRHP in Washington County
John Welsh House, Wyndmoor, Pennsylvania, listed on the NRHP in Montgomery County